Deal Island may refer to:

 Deal Island, Maryland, USA
 Deal Island (Tasmania), Australia